James Gerald Sheahan (28 December 1872 – 30 August 1959) was an Australian rules footballer who played with Melbourne in the Victorian Football League (VFL).

His brother Fred Sheahan also played for Melbourne.

Notes

External links 

1872 births
Australian rules footballers from Melbourne
Melbourne Football Club players
1959 deaths
Melbourne Football Club (VFA) players